Andy Gibson (born 2 March 1982) is a Scottish footballer, who played for Partick Thistle, Stirling Albion, Stenhousemuir and Stranraer.

External links

1982 births
Living people
Scottish footballers
Association football midfielders
Partick Thistle F.C. players
Stirling Albion F.C. players
Stenhousemuir F.C. players
Stranraer F.C. players
Glasgow Perthshire F.C. players
Scottish Football League players
Footballers from Glasgow
Scottish Premier League players